Lacy Island is one of the many uninhabited Canadian arctic islands in Qikiqtaaluk Region, Nunavut. It is located at the confluence of Hudson Strait and the Labrador Sea. The island, a member of the Button Islands, is situated in the northeast part of the grouping.

Other islands in the immediate vicinity include Goodwin Island, MacColl Island, Lawson Island, Erhardt Island, and Observation Island.

Geography
The island is square in shape and it offers a sheltered landing area on its southwest side.

References 

Islands of Hudson Strait
Islands of the Labrador Sea
Uninhabited islands of Qikiqtaaluk Region